The African Origins Of UFOs is a book by Anthony Joseph published in October 2006 by Salt Publishing. 

The text is an experimental, time shifting narrative in poetic prose and poetry that contains elements of afro futurism, metafiction, science fiction, surrealism, mythology and written in an innovative language, infused with the speech rhythms of Trinidadian nation language. It is a hybrid text that blurs the boundaries between prose and poetry. An excerpt appeared in the anthology Dark Matter (Warner Books 2000, Ed. Sheree Thomas).

External links 
 Publisher's profile of ''The African Origins of UFOs.
 

African Origins of UFOs, The